ASC Diaraf (or Djaraf, partly known as Jaraaf, mostly used in the Gambia), a Senegalese professional association football club, has gained entry to Confederation of African Football (CAF) competitions on several occasions. They have represented Senegal in the Champions League on thirteen occasions, the Confederation Cup  on Four separate occasions, the now-defunct Cup Winners' Cup three separate occasions, and the now-defunct CAF Cup one occasion.

Diaraf has appeared 21 times in continental competitions, the most of any Senegalese clubs.

History
Diaraf later appeared in African competitions, their first was in 1968, later Diaraf lost to Stade Malien in the 1971 African Cup of Champions Clubs, in 1976, they defeated Os Balantas with a total of 10 goals and later Togo's Lomé I, Diaraf lost to Guinea's Hafia FC in the semis, a year later, they challenged ASC Garde Nationale from Mauritania and Hearts of Oak from Guinea.  Five years later, Diaraf started in the preliminaries of the 1983 African Cup of Champions Clubs and headed up to the semis where they lost to Asante Kotoko FC, the second match with Africa Sports ended scoring 3–0 penalties as two matches were scoreless, Diaraf defeated JE Tizi-Ouzou of Algeria with their only goal in the first match to nil, in the quarterfinals, Diaraf with a total of three goals defeated Morocco's KAC de Kenitra, this was their greatest appearance  Diaraf appeared in the 1990 edition and lost to Heartland FC in the first round as they scored just a goal in the home match.  Diaraf challenged with three clubs up to CS Sfaxien in 1996 African Cup of Champions Clubs.  In 2001 and under the new name CAF Champions League, Diaraf challenged Real de Banjul from the neighbouring Gambia and then lost to ASEC Mimosas by the away goals rule of one point.   Three years later, Diaraf challenged with ASFAG and Enyimba in the 2004 CAF Champions League.  A year later, Diaraf lost to Guiinea's Fello Star under the away goals role of two goals scored in Dakar, their third consecutive appearance was in 2006, Diaraf defeated Liberia's LPRC Oilers with three goals, then once more lost to Enyimba 2–0 as Diaraf scored nothing.  The 2007 CAF Champions League was their fourth consecutive appearance, in the preliminaries, they lost to Maranatha FC of Togo, Diaraf just scored a goal in the home match.  Their recent appearance was in 2011 where Diaraf advanced up to the second round, first they defeated the Gambia Ports Authority, then Mali's second great Djoliba AC and last Tunisia's Espérance ST where they lost 1–5 in two of its matches.   Diaraf has appeared in the continental championship 13 times, the most of any club from Senegal. The total goals at the African Champions League for Diaraf is over 77.

Diaraf's appearance in the African cup competitions was in 1984 where they challenged with the Mighty Blackpool and Al-Ahly Tripoli.  In 1986, they challenged with Starlight FC from the neighboring Gambia and won 4–3 in penalties and CS Hammam-Lif from Tunisia and lost under the away goals rule of two points.  Their third competition in 1992 faced with ASFAG and lost with two points.  The next competition was the CAF Cup in 1999 and faced FC Man and WAC Casablanca.  A decade later, Diaraf returned and this time under the CAF Confederation Cup in 2009 and lost to ASF Bobo-Dioulasso in the preliminaries, a year later, Diaraf went up to the preliminaries and lost FUS Rabat with a total of two goals to three, their recent competition was in 2014 where they lost to Ebusua Dwarfs by a total of one goal.

CAF Competitions

Non-CAF Competitions

WAFU Club Championship

Statistics

By season
Information correct as of 1 November 2014.
Key

Pld = Played
W = Games won
D = Games drawn
L = Games lost
F = Goals for
A = Goals against
Grp = Group stage

PR = Preliminary round
R1 = First round
R2 = Second round
SR16 = Second Round of 16
R16 = Round of 16
QF = Quarter-final
SF = Semi-final

Key to colours and symbols:

By competition

In Africa
:

Non-CAF competitions
The French West African Cup was a football (soccer) tournament between clubs of the former French Western African territories, it existed from 1947 to 1960.
1948: Foyer France 4 – 0 Jeunesse Club d'Abidjan
1952: Lost to Etoile Sportive Porto-Novo of Dahomey (now Benin) in the semis
1956: Lost to Jeanne d'Arc (now Stade Malien) of Mali (then also known as the French Sudan) in the semis
1958: Lost to Africa Sports in the semis

Statistics by country

CAF Competitions

Other statistics
Total matches played at the CAF Champions League: 54
Total matches played at home: 29
Total matches played away: 29
Total number of wins at the CAF Champions League: 27
Total home wins: 21
Total away wins: 6
Total draws at the CAF Champions League: 13
Total home draws: 7
Total away draws: 6
Total number of goals scored at the CAF Champions League: 69
Total matches played at cup competitions: 22
Total matches played at home: 11
Total matches played away: 11
Total matches played at the CAF Cup: 4
Total number of wins at cup competitions: 7
Total home wins: 6
Total away wins: 1
Total draws at cup competitions: 7
Total home draws: 5
Total away draws: 2
Total number of goals scored at cup competitions: 17
Total number of goals scored at the CAF Cup: 3

References

External links
Details of the African competitions at the section of Jaraaf 's (Djaraf's) official website 
Djaraf's continental appearances

ASC Jaraaf
Senegalese football clubs in international competitions